Nancy Banks-Smith (born 1929) is a British television and radio critic, who spent most of her career writing for The Guardian.

Life and career
Born in Manchester and raised in a pub, she was educated at Roedean School.

Banks-Smith began her career in journalism in 1951 as a reporter at the Northern Daily Telegraph. In 1955, after a brief period at the women's section of the Sunday Mirror, she moved to the Daily Herald as a reporter. She worked for the Daily Express from 1960 to 1965 as a feature writer, moving to be a TV critic for The Sun in 1965. She left the newspaper in 1969 when it was bought by Rupert Murdoch.

Banks-Smith began writing for The Guardian in 1970, with her television column becoming a leading feature of the newspaper. She has remained with the paper since then, though by 2010 she no longer wrote daily reviews. Until 2017, she wrote a monthly column for the paper entitled "A month in Ambridge", reviewing recent developments in the radio soap opera The Archers.

Awards
In 1970, she was recommended for the Order of the British Empire, which she declined.

References

External links
Nancy Banks-Smith archives of her television reviews in The Guardian
Last Night's TV Archive of Guardian TV reviews (multiple reviewers) from 24 Dec 1998 onwards
'A nice little job for a woman at home', Nancy Banks-Smith on her 30 years as a TV critic, The Guardian, 21 November 2001
Nancy Banks-Smith Classic Reviews, The Guardian, 4 February 2010

1929 births
Living people
British television critics
Women television critics
The Guardian journalists
Writers from Manchester
Radio critics